Amoros Nshimirimana (born 7 August 2001) is a professional footballer who plays as a forward for German Regionalliga club SV Straelen. Born in Burundi, he has represented the Netherlands at youth international level.

Club career
A former youth academy player of Utrecht and Willem II, Nshimirimana joined Helmond Sport in January 2022. He made his professional debut for the club on 4 February 2022 in a 2–0 defeat against Jong PSV.

On 31 May 2022, Willem II announced the return of Nshimirimana to their U21 team. Two months later in July 2022, he joined German Regionalliga club SV Straelen. He made his debut for the club on 30 July by scoring a goal in a 3–4 DFB-Pokal defeat against FC St. Pauli.

International career
Nshimirimana is a former Dutch youth international. He have made an appearance for under-15 team in 2016.

Personal life
Born in Burundi, Nshimirimana moved to the Netherlands at the age of nine.

Career statistics

Club

References

External links
 

2001 births
Living people
Sportspeople from Bujumbura
Burundian emigrants to the Netherlands
Dutch people of Burundian descent
Association football forwards
Burundian footballers
Dutch footballers
Netherlands youth international footballers
Helmond Sport players
SV 19 Straelen players
Eerste Divisie players
Regionalliga players
Dutch expatriate footballers
Dutch expatriate sportspeople in Germany
Expatriate footballers in Germany